Cash or li is a traditional Chinese unit of weight.

The terms "cash" or "le" were documented to have been used by British explorers in the 1830s when trading in Qing territories of China.

Currently, it is  candareen or  catty, namely .

See also
 Chinese units of measurement

References

External links 
 Chinese/Metric/Imperial Measurement Converter

 

Units of mass
Chinese units in Hong Kong